Black Caucus  may refer to one of the following:


United States

National 
Black Caucus of the American Library Association, an affiliate of the American Library Association for African American library professionals
Congressional Black Caucus, a group made of most of the African American members of the United States Congress 
Congressional Black Caucus Foundation, an educational foundation
National Black Caucus of State Legislators, an American political organization composed of African Americans in state legislatures

Individual states
California Legislative Black Caucus 
Delaware Black Caucus
Georgia Legislative Black Caucus 
Illinois Legislative Black Caucus 
Indiana Black Legislative Caucus 
Kansas African American Legislative Caucus
Louisiana Legislative Black Caucus 
Legislative Black Caucus of Maryland 
Missouri Legislative Black Caucus
Ohio Legislative Black Caucus  
Pennsylvania Legislative Black Caucus 
Virginia Legislative Black Caucus

Individual cities
New York City Council Black, Latino and Asian (BLA) Caucus

Others
 Black Caucus, a group of people at the centre of the Australian Black Power movement in the 1960s–1970s